The 2022–23 season is Al Ain Football Club's 49th in existence and the club's 47th consecutive season in the top-level football league in the UAE.

Players

First Team

Unregistered players

From Reserve U21 and Youth Academy

New contracts

Injury record

Transfers

In

Loans in

Out

Loans out

Competitions

Overview

Pro League

League table

Results summary

Results by round

Matches

UAE President's Cup

Semi-finals

UAE League Cup

Quarter-finals

Semi-finals

UAE Super Cup

Statistics

Squad appearances and goals

Clean sheets
As of 10 March 2023

Goalscorers

Disciplinary record

Assists

Hat-tricks

4 – Player scored four goals.

References

External links
 Al Ain FC official website 

2022–23
Emirati football clubs 2022–23 seasons